The Education Act 1944 (7 and 8 Geo 6 c. 31) made major changes in the provision and governance of secondary schools in England and Wales. It is also known as the "Butler Act" after the President of the Board of Education, R. A. Butler. Historians consider it a "triumph for progressive reform," and it became a core element of the post-war consensus supported by all major parties. The Act was repealed in steps with the last parts repealed in 1996.

Background
The basis of the 1944 Education Act was a memorandum entitled Education After the War (commonly referred to as the "green book") which was compiled by Board of Education officials and distributed to selected recipients in June 1941. The President of the Board of Education at that time was Butler's predecessor, Herwald Ramsbotham; Butler succeeded him on 20 July 1941. The Green Book formed the basis of the 1943 White Paper, Educational Reconstruction which was itself used to formulate the 1944 Act. The purpose of the Act was to address the country's educational needs amid demands for social reform that had been an issue before the Second World War began. The Act incorporated proposals developed by leading specialists in the 1920s and 1930s such as R. H. Tawney and William Henry Hadow. The text of the Act was drafted by Board of Education officials including Griffiths G. Williams, William Cleary, H. B. Wallis, S. H. Wood, Robert S. Wood, and Maurice Holmes.

There was a desire to keep the churches involved in education but they could not afford to modernise without government help. By negotiation with the Archbishop of Canterbury, William Temple (1881-1944), and other religious leaders, a majority of the Anglican church schools became voluntary controlled and were effectively absorbed into the state system in return for funding. The Act also encouraged non-sectarian religious teaching in secular schools. A third of the Anglican church schools became voluntary aided which entitled them to enhanced state subsidies whilst retaining autonomy over admissions, curriculum and teacher appointments; Roman Catholic schools also chose this option.

The legislation was enacted in 1944, but its changes were designed to take effect after the war, thus allowing for additional pressure groups to have their influence. Paul Addison argues that in the end, the act was widely praised by Conservatives because it honoured religion and social hierarchy, by Labour because it opened new opportunities for working class children, and by the general public because it ended the fees they had to pay for secondary education. State primary education had been free since the 1891 Education Act; even after 1944 certain older grammar schools—the direct grant grammar schools—continued to charge fees but also admitted state pupils on scholarships.

New policies
Butler designed the Act as an expression of  "One Nation Conservatism" in the tradition attributed to Disraeli, which called for paternalism by the upper class towards the working class.

The Act ended the traditional all-age (5-14) elementary sector, enforcing the division between primary (5–11 years old) and secondary (11–15 years old) education that many local authorities had already introduced. It abolished fees on parents for state secondary schools. It brought a more equitable funding system to localities and to different school sectors. The Act renamed the Board of Education as the Ministry of Education, giving it greater powers and a bigger budget. While defining the school leaving age as 15, it granted the government the power to raise the age to 16 "as soon as the Minister is satisfied that it has become practicable", though the change was not implemented until 1973. It also brought in a new system for setting teacher salaries.

One of the results of the Act was to increase the openness of secondary schools to girls and the working class, educating and mobilising them. Another result was that the percentage of children attending higher education tripled from 1% to 3%.

The Act provided both for nursery schools and Further Education programmes through community colleges, offering education for both children and adults, a measure that was only followed through by a few LEAs such as the Cambridgeshire Village Colleges, Leicestershire Community Colleges and Coventry, Derbyshire and Nottinghamshire community schools.

Anglican schools were continued, but brought under increased state funding and control. Every state-funded school was required to begin the day with a nondenominational religious prayer. This clause was amended by the Education Reform Act 1988, which specified that the act of worship should be of a 'broadly Christian nature' unless such a message was deemed to be inappropriate for a particular school or group of children. The amendment also specified that the act of worship could now take place in classes, rather than the previous system of conducting worship in assemblies.

The Act was supported by HORSA (Hutting Operation for the Raising of the School-Leaving Age) a building programme to provide 'hut'-style accommodation to meet the additional educational demand.

School meals and milk

The Education Act 1944 made it a duty of local education authorities to provide school meals and milk. The authority could remit the charge for the meal in cases of hardship. The Provision of Free Milk Regulations 1946, made under Section 49 of the 1944 act, provided free school milk to all children under 18 in maintained schools from August 1946.

In 1968 Edward Short, the Labour Secretary of State for Education and Science, withdrew free milk from secondary schools for children over eleven. His successor, Conservative Margaret Thatcher withdrew free school milk from children over seven in 1971, earning her the nickname "Thatcher, the Milk Snatcher". Shirley Williams withdrew free milk for children between seven and five in 1977.

See also

 United Kingdom home front during World War II

References

Further reading 

 Aldrich, Richard, Dennis Dean, and Peter Gordon. Education and policy in England in the twentieth century. (1991). 
 Batteson, C. H. "The 1944 Education Act reconsidered." Educational Review 51.1 (1999): 5-15. DOI:10.1080/00131919997632
 Dunford, John, Paul Sharp, The Education System in England and Wales, London: Longman, 1990, 17–24.
 Gosden, Peter. "Putting the Act together." History of Education 24#3 (1995): 195-207. online
 Goldin, Claudia, "The Human Capital Century and American Leadership: Virtues of the Past," The Journal of Economic History, 2001, Volume 61, Number 2.
 Green, S. J. D. "The 1944 Education Act: A Church‐State Perspective." Parliamentary History 19#1 (2000): 148-164.
 Griggs, Clive. The TUC and Education Reform, 1926-1970 (Routledge, 2013).
 Hillman, Nicholas. "Public schools and the Fleming report of 1944: shunting the first-class carriage on to an immense siding?." History of Education 41#2 (2012): 235-255.
 Howard, Anthony. RAB: The Life of R.A. Butler (2013) ch 10. (originally published 1987)
 Jago, Michael.  Rab Butler: The Best Prime Minister We Never Had? (2015) ch 9. 
 Jeffereys, Kevin. "R. A. Butler, the Board of Education and the 1944 Education Act," History (1984) 69#227 pp 415–431.
 Ku, Hsiao-Yuh. "Fighting for social democracy: RH Tawney and educational reconstruction in the Second World War." Paedagogica Historica 52#3 (2016): 266-285.
 Ku, Hsiao-Yuh. "Education for liberal democracy: Fred Clarke and the 1944 Education Act." History of Education 42#5 (2013): 578-597.
 McCulloch, Gary. Educational reconstruction: The 1944 education act and the twenty-first century (Routledge, 2013).
 McCulloch, Gary. "British Labour Party education policy and comprehensive education: from Learning to Live to Circular 10/65." History of Education 45#2 (2016): 225-245. online
 Middleton, Nigel. "Lord Butler and the Education Act of 1944," British Journal of Educational Studies (1972) 20#2 pp 178–191
 Simon, Brian. "The 1944 Education Act: A Conservative Measure?," History of Education. (1986) 15#1 pp 31–43
 Wallace, Ron G. "The origins and authorship of the 1944 Education Act." History of Education 10.4 (1981): 283-290. DOI:10.1080/0046760810100405
 Wright, Susannah. "The Faith of the Democrat: The Association for Education in Citizenship, 1934–1944." in Morality and Citizenship in English Schools (Palgrave Macmillan, London, 2017) pp. 177-208.

External links
Ellen Wilkinson & the 1944 Education Act – UK Parliament Living Heritage
Change and continuity: reflections on the Butler act Speech to commemorate the 60th anniversary of the 1944 Education Act, given by the chief inspector of schools, David Bell

Acts of the Parliament of the United Kingdom concerning England and Wales
August 1944 events
Food policy in the United Kingdom
Milk
Repealed United Kingdom Acts of Parliament
Secondary education in England
Secondary education in Wales
United Kingdom Education Acts
United Kingdom Acts of Parliament 1944
1944 in England
1944 in Wales